New Hope, North Carolina may refer to:

New Hope, Franklin County, North Carolina
New Hope, Perquimans County, North Carolina
New Hope, Surry County, North Carolina
New Hope, Wayne County, North Carolina
New Hope, Wilson County, North Carolina, site of the Alfred and Martha Jane Thompson House and Williams Barn